Yūki Yamamoto, Yuki Yamamoto or Yuuki Yamamoto may refer to:

, Japanese footballer
, Japanese fashion model